Lycée La Fontaine in Niamey, Niger, is a French-speaking international school attached to the French Embassy. It was established in 1962. In 2021 it had some 876 students (32% French, 68% local and from other countries) and 56 educators.

The school takes students from primary to lycée (high school) level.

See also

 American International School of Niamey - American school

References

External links 
 Lycée Français La Fontaine 
 French embassy in Niger 

Educational institutions established in 1962
Fontaine
Schools in Niamey
International schools in Niger
1962 establishments in Niger